Robert Taylor (1876–1919) was an English footballer who played in the Football League for Bolton Wanderers with whom he played in the 1904 FA Cup Final.

References

1876 births
1919 deaths
English footballers
Association football forwards
English Football League players
Everton F.C. players
Bolton Wanderers F.C. players
FA Cup Final players